American Society of Phlebotomy Technicians (ASPT) is the second oldest certifying agency for Phlebotomy.  The ASPT was founded in 1983.

See also 
 Phlebotomy
 Bloodletting
 List of healthcare occupations
 List of medical organizations

References 

Medical and health organizations based in North Carolina
Organizations established in 1983
1983 establishments in the United States